Merijn Korevaar (born 7 May 1994) is a Dutch racing cyclist. He rode at the 2014 UCI Road World Championships. He is the older brother of the cyclist Jeanne Korevaar.

Major results

2011
 6th Overall Driedaagse van Axel
2012
 2nd Road race, National Junior Road Championships
 4th Gent–Menen
 5th Overall Grand Prix Rüebliland
1st Stage 2
 6th Overall Tour of Istria
 9th Remouchamps–Ferrières–Remouchamps
2014
 8th Overall Olympia's Tour
1st Young rider classification
2015
 6th Dorpenomloop Rucphen
2016
 8th Ster van Zwolle
 8th Arno Wallaard Memorial

References

External links

1994 births
Living people
Dutch male cyclists
People from Liesveld
UCI Road World Championships cyclists for the Netherlands
Sportspeople from South Holland
20th-century Dutch people
21st-century Dutch people